Bimmer (alternatively Romanised as Bummer or Bumer) is a 2003 Russian road movie directed by Peter Buslov, written by Peter Buslov and Denis Rodimin. The plot revolves around four friends who get into trouble with the law and flee Moscow in a black BMW (the eponymous "bimmer").

As the men drive across the Russian expanse, they encounter corruption, violence, poverty, and various situations characterizing the bleakness and challenges of small-town life in post-Soviet Russia.

Considered to be not only an action film, but also a critique of the policies of Boris Yeltsin, Bimmer depicts the economic crisis that followed Russia's sudden transition to a free market economy, and with it, a lost generation of men who grow up in a world ruled by criminal gangs and corrupt law enforcement.

Despite a modest budget of US$700,000, and a limited cinematic release, Bimmer became a national hit in Russia, noted both for its cinematic quality and its soundtrack. Both the film and its soundtrack have won awards, including the Golden Aries from the Russian Guild of Film Critics.

Plot 
Four car thefts nicknamed Ramah, Cat, Dimon and Killa got in trouble and had to runaway from Moscow. On the road they got more and more trouble. At last, without money, without ability to connect with his friends they made attempt of robbery in small town but Ramah and Killa died, Cat caught by police and Dimon hid, left his BMW in the forest.

Development

At the beginning of the film, it can be seen that the BMW which is being stolen belongs to a Latvian or that the scene is actually meant to happen in Latvia, since the car has improvised 'LV' car license-plates on it.  An alternative explanation is that the car was not legally imported into Russia and was being driven with Latvian plates to avoid customs duties.

Some scenes of the film were filmed in the town of Zvenigorod.

The musical theme of the film is the ringtone of Kostya's cell phone.

Sequel
In 2006, Bimmer: Film Vtoroy, a sequel to Bimmer, was released. It was directed by Peter Buslov and written by Kim Belov, Peter Buslov, Denis Rodimin and Ivan Vyrypaev. The film proved to be commercially successful, taking in nearly US$14,000,000 at the box office, even though it didn't have the same positive reviews as the first one. A computer game was released in the same year, titled Bimmer: Torn Towers.

References

External links

Screenshots

2003 films
2003 crime drama films
Gangster films
Russian road movies
Russian crime drama films
2000s road movies
Films about automobiles
Films set in Moscow
Films shot in Moscow Oblast